Morwan Dam is located in the village of Morwan in Jawad tehsil, 24 km from Neemuch in the Indian state of Madhya Pradesh. The dam is constructed wholly from stones and clay on the River Gambhir and is mainly used for irrigation and water supply. Boating facilities and a public garden are provided. Access by bus is via the Neemuch-Singoli-Kota Road.

References

Reservoirs and dams in India